Violence Unimagined is the fifteenth studio album by American death metal band Cannibal Corpse, released on April 16, 2021. It is the band's first album in nearly four years since Red Before Black (2017), the longest gap between two records in Cannibal Corpse's career, and the first studio album to feature producer Erik Rutan on lead guitar, replacing Pat O'Brien in February 2021 after nearly two years of filling in for him on tour.

Background
Cannibal Corpse began writing for new material in 2019, and in 2020 the group began demos for Violence Unimagined. In a new interview with Wall of Sound, drummer Paul Mazurkiewicz spoke about Erik Rutan joining the band revealing: "He's a great guy, great worker, great guitar player. He wrote some great songs and it's been a challenge to play his stuff and fun to learn somebody else's take on what Cannibal Corpse would sound like in their eyes. It's been positive all round having him for sure."

Reception

Violence Unimagined received positive reviews. Sean McLennan of New Noise Magazine wrote, "Continuously reinventing each album around creative new ways to kill or be killed, Cannibal Corpse continue their mission to spread global devastation through the dominant beast that is Violence Unimagined. Marking the band's fifteenth release through Metal Blade Records, the upcoming terror embodies every horrendous characteristic we've come to love about this band and then some. Instrumentally unstoppable and visually indescribable, Violence Unimagined sees Cannibal Corpse entering the post-pandemic world as the colossal conquerors of death metal." Wall of Sound's Duane James praised the release (and inclusion of new guitarist Erik Rutan) giving it a 9/10 and revealing, "these icons of death metal have once again risen above and delivered a rock solid classic"

Loudwire called it one of the best metal albums of 2021.

Accolades

Track listing

Personnel

Cannibal Corpse
 George "Corpsegrinder" Fisher – vocals
 Erik Rutan – lead guitar, backing vocals on "Murderous Rampage"
 Rob Barrett – rhythm guitar
 Alex Webster – bass
 Paul Mazurkiewicz – drums

Additional
 Vince Locke – artwork

Charts

References

2021 albums
Albums produced by Erik Rutan
Cannibal Corpse albums
Metal Blade Records albums